Chester is a town in and the county seat of Liberty County, Montana, United States. The population was 847 at the time of both the 2010 and 2020 U.S. Census.

History
The name “Chester” was chosen by the first telegraph operator here and named in honor of his hometown in Pennsylvania. It was incorporated in 1910.

Geography
Chester is located at  (48.511105, -110.967126).

Demographics

2010 census
As of the census of 2010, there were 847 people, 395 households, and 223 families living in the town. The racial makeup of the town was 97.3% White, 0.2% African American, 0.2% Native American, 0.2% Asian, and 2.0% from two or more races.

There were 395 households, of which 21.3% had children under the age of 18 living with them, 48.4% were married couples living together, 7.3% had a female householder with no husband present, 0.8% had a male householder with no wife present, and 43.5% were non-families. 41.8% of all households were made up of individuals, and 21.7% had someone living alone who was 65 years of age or older. The average household size was 2.09 and the average family size was 2.86.

The median age in the town was 51 years. 21.3% of residents were under the age of 18; 4.3% were between the ages of 18 and 24; 17.2% were from 25 to 44; 29.3% were from 45 to 64; and 27.9% were 65 years of age or older. The gender makeup of the town was 45.5% male and 54.5% female.

2000 census
As of the census of 2000, there were 871 people, 384 households, and 228 families living in the town. The population density was 1,668.2 people per square mile (715.5/km2). There were 471 housing units at an average density of 1,010.2 per square mile (386.9/km2). The racial makeup of the town was 98.74% White, 0.23% Native American, 0.57% Asian, and 0.46% from two or more races.

There were 384 households, out of which 24.7% had children under the age of 18 living with them, 50.5% were married couples living together, 7.6% had a female householder with no husband present, and 40.6% were non-families. 37.2% of all households were made up of individuals, and 18.8% had someone living alone who was 65 years of age or older. The average household size was 2.11 and the average family size was 2.79.

In the town, the population was spread out, with 20.7% under the age of 18, 4.4% from 18 to 24, 20.1% from 25 to 44, 27.2% from 45 to 64, and 27.7% who were 65 years of age or older. The median age was 47 years. For every 100 females there were 84.1 males. For every 100 females age 18 and over, there were 81.8 males.

The median income for a household in the town was $27,578, and the median income for a family was $42,639. Males had a median income of $26,154 versus $17,417 for females. The per capita income for the town was $16,077. About 14.6% of families and 13.5% of the population were below the poverty line, including 17.1% of those under age 18 and 13.5% of those age 65 or over.

Climate
Chester experiences a semi-arid climate (Köppen BSk) with long, cold, dry winters and short, hot, wetter summers. This type of a semi-arid climate is a dry continental variety with similar temperatures as the more humid ones, albeit with less precipitation.

Infrastructure
Liberty County Airport is a county-owned airport a mile west of Chester.  CJI (Chester-Joplin-Inverness) School was formed in 2005 and competes in the Class C division of the Montana High School Association. The Liberty Medical Center is host to primary care physicians, nurses, and visiting medical specialists.

During the summer, the Liberty County Museum showcases the rich history of the area and its people. Also, during the summer, the city operates the swimming pool, provides certified swim lessons, and hosts an annual swim meet drawing competitors from around the state.  The Liberty Village Arts Center displays a variety of local and regional items for show and for purchase.  At the library, there are print and digital media and internet connected computers.  The city park provides a pavilion, picnic and playground area, and restrooms.  In the winter, there is an ice skating rink.

Liberty County Transit is available for all ages and provides transportation within Liberty County and to connect to Amtrak in Shelby or to the bus and planes in Great Falls.  Transportation for medical appointments is also available.

Recreation
Fishing and floating are also available on the Marias River downstream from Tiber Dam. The Sweet Grass Hills to the north are the highest elevation peaks east of Glacier Park within  of Highway 2. Hunting for deer, antelope, game birds, and elk is popular in the fall.

Local media

Radio
 KSEN AM 1150 "Good as Gold", Shelby, MT(Oldies)
 KZIN FM 96.7 "Wide Open Country", Shelby, MT (Country music)
 KPQX FM 92.5 "Your Kind of Country", Havre, MT (Country music)
 KXEI FM 95.1 "Your Network of Praise", Havre, MT (Christian music)
 KMON AM 560 Great Falls, MT(Classic Country)

Television
Stations available from the Great Falls market:
 KRTV Ch. 3.1 (CBS), Ch 3.2 (CW), Ch 3.3 (Grit), Ch 3.4 (ION), Ch 3.5 (Laff)
 KTVH Ch. 12.1 (NBC), Ch 12.2 (CW), Ch 12.3 (Cozi TV), 12.4 (Court TV), 12.5 (Court TV Mystery)
 KUGF-TV Ch. 21.1 (PBS), Ch 21.2 (PBS Kids), Ch 21.3 (Create), Ch 21.4 (World)), Ch 21.5 (Legislature)
 KFBB Ch. 5.1 (ABC), Ch 5.2 (FOX), Ch 5.3 (SWX Right Now)

Stations available from the Lethbridge, Alberta, market:
 CISA-DT Ch. 7.1 (Global)
 CFCN-DT Ch. 13.1 (CTV)

Satellite television providers are available to the entire area. Wired internet streaming available from Triangle Telephone ITS.

Newspapers
The Liberty County Times is a weekly newspaper from Chester.  The Havre Daily News is regionally available. Its circulation is 3,500 papers daily, published Monday through Friday. It has a full online edition by subscription, as well as some free content online. The larger Great Falls Tribune is also available in most areas.

Notable people
Philip Aaberg, pianist, keyboardist, and composer was born in Chester in 1949
Michael Claxton (born 1976), basketball player and coach
Casey FitzSimmons, NFL tight end with Detroit Lions
William E. Hunt, Montana Supreme Court Justice (1985–2000)
Allen Kolstad, former Lieutenant Governor of Montana (1989–1991)

References

External links
 Town of Chester

Towns in Liberty County, Montana
County seats in Montana